Lady Time is a 1978 (see 1978 in music) studio album by the American jazz singer Ella Fitzgerald, accompanied by the unusual combination of an organist, Jackie Davis, and a drummer, Louie Bellson.

Track listing
 "I'm Walkin'" (Dave Bartholomew, Fats Domino) – 5:36 
 "All or Nothing at All" (Arthur Altman, Jack Lawrence) – 6:29 
 "I Never Had a Chance" (Irving Berlin) – 4:03 
 "I Cried for You" (Gus Arnheim, Arthur Freed, Abe Lyman) – 3:17 
 "What Will I Tell My Heart?" (Irving Gordon, Lawrence, Peter Tinturin) – 1:57 
 "Since I Fell for You" (Buddy Johnson) – 4:26 
 "And the Angels Sing" (Ziggy Elman, Johnny Mercer) – 3:07 
 "Confessin'" (Doc Daugherty, Al J. Neiburg, Ellis Reynolds) – 2:50 
 "Mack the Knife" (Marc Blitzstein, Bertolt Brecht, Kurt Weill) – 2:57 
 "That's My Desire" (Helmy Kressa, Carroll Loveday) – 3:02 
 "I'm in the Mood for Love" (Dorothy Fields, Jimmy McHugh) – 4:36

Personnel
Recorded June 19, June 20, 1978, in Hollywood, Los Angeles:

 Ella Fitzgerald – vocals
 Jackie Davis – organ
 Louie Bellson – drums

References

1978 albums
Ella Fitzgerald albums
Pablo Records albums
Albums produced by Norman Granz